Dr. Meir Margalit (born 1952) is a human and civil rights activist in Jerusalem. He received a Ph.D. in history from Haifa University. Dr. Margalit is a researcher of the history of the Jewish community during the period of Mandatory Palestine, specializing in the early peace and bi-national movements within the population prior to the U.N. mandated partition of Palestine in 1947, and the subsequent creation of the State of Israel in 1948. Dr. Margalit is a founder of the Israeli Committee Against Housing Demolitions, and CAPI, The Committee for the Advancement of Peace Initiatives.

Meir Margalit was born in Argentina and moved to Israel in 1972. During his military service he served in a Jewish settlement in Gaza Strip. He was injured in the Yom Kippur War of 1973. During his recovery he began to gradually adopt a radical progressive and pacifist position. He was an elected member of the Jerusalem City Council, representing the Left-Wing Meretz Party between 1998 and 2002. Elected again for Meretz in 2008, he is currently a member of the city council, officially in charge of the East Jerusalem portfolio. He is known for his staunch criticism of the various Jerusalem mayors for their policies of perceived and realized discrimination towards the Palestinian residents of the city. Margalit is the author of various books on municipal policy and a frequent speaker and lecturer in many countries around the world.

References

1952 births
Living people
20th-century Israeli non-fiction writers
20th-century Israeli politicians
21st-century Israeli non-fiction writers
21st-century Israeli politicians
Argentine emigrants to Israel
Argentine Jews
Deputy Mayors of Jerusalem
Historians of Israel
Israeli historians
Israeli human rights activists
Jewish human rights activists
Jewish Israeli politicians
Jewish peace activists
Lecturers
Meretz politicians
University of Haifa alumni